The 2003 Meteor Music Awards were hosted by comedian Dara Ó Briain. It was the third edition of Ireland's national music awards. Actors Colin Farrell, Colm Meaney and Stephen Rea were among the awards presenters.

Performances 
There were performances on the night from the ill-fated Irish pop group Six who performed the song "After the Gold Rush", Tom Jones, The Thrills, B2K, Alabama 3, Samantha Mumba, Westlife and Sinéad O'Connor.

Nominations 
For 2003 nominees, see here.

List of winners

References

External links 
 Official site
 MCD Promotions
 List of winners through the years
 Photos

Meteor Music Awards
Meteor Awards